Josh Nicholson  (born 30 May 1995) is an Australian wheelchair rugby player.

Nicholson was born on 30 May 1995. At the age of fourteen months, he lost part of all four limbs to meningococcal disease. He attended Pioneer High School in Mackay, Queensland. In 2018, is undertaking studying Bachelor of Architectural Design  at Griffith University.

In 2014, he was a member of Queensland junior wheelchair basketball team, the Rolling Thunder that won the Junior National Wheelchair Basketball Championships (Kevin Coombes Cup). He is classified as 2.0 wheelchair rugby player.  He made his international debut for the Australian wheelchair rugby team, the Steelers.

At the 2018 IWRF World Championship in Sydney, Australia, he was a member of the Australian team that won the silver medal after being defeated by Japan 61–62 in the gold medal game.

Nicholson won his first world championship gold medal at the 2022 IWRF World Championship in Vejle, Denmark, when Australia defeated the United States .

References

External links

Australian wheelchair rugby players
1995 births
Living people